Ayoub El Khaliqi  (born 11 September 1986) is a Moroccan former professional footballer who played as a right-back. He made ten appearances for the Morocco national team scoring once.

Honours
FUS Rabat
GNF 2: 2008–09
CAF Confederation Cup: 2010
Moroccan Throne Cup: 2010

Ittihad Tanger
Botola: 2017–18

Individual
CAF Team of the Year: 2011

References

External links
 
 
 

Living people
1986 births
Moroccan footballers
Footballers from Rabat
Association football fullbacks
Morocco international footballers
Wydad AC players
Fath Union Sport players
Ittihad Tanger players